This is a list of British desserts, i.e. desserts characteristic of British cuisine, the culinary tradition of the United Kingdom. The British kitchen has a long tradition of noted sweet-making, particularly with puddings, custards, and creams; custard sauce is called crème anglaise (English cream) in French cuisine.

British desserts

A

   
 Apple pie
 Apple crumble
 Arctic roll

B

 Bakewell tart
 Banoffee pie
 Bread and butter pudding
 Bombe glacee
 Brandy snaps

C
 Carrot cake
 Cherries jubilee
 Chestnut pudding
 Cobbler
 Coconut ice
 Crumble
 Custard tart

E

 Eton mess
 Eve's pudding
 English cake

F
 Flapjack
Flies graveyard
 Flummery
 Fruit fool
 Fudge

G
 Gypsy tart
 Gingerbread

K
 Knickerbocker glory

L
 Lardy cake

M
 Manchester tart
 Maids of honour tart
 Mince pie

R
 Raspberry Ripple
 Rice pudding
 Rhubarb crumble

S

 Shortcake
 Shrewsbury cake
 Spoom
 Spotted dick
 Strawberry rhubarb pie
 Syllabub
 Swiss roll
 Sponge cake
 Sussex pond pudding

T
 Treacle tart
 Trifle
 Tea cake

V 

 Victoria sponge

Y
 Yorkshire Curd Tart

British cakes

 
 Angel cake
 Banbury cake
 Battenberg cake
 Caraway seed cake
 Carrot cake
 Chelsea bun
 Chorley cake
 Colin the Caterpillar
 Date and walnut loaf
 Dundee cake
 Eccles cake
 Fat rascal
 Jaffa Cakes
 Lardy cake
 Madeira cake
 Malt loaf
 Parkin
 Pink Wafer
 Pound cake
 Rock cake
 Sponge cake
 Tottenham cake
 Welsh cake

British puddings

 Bread and butter pudding 
 Bread pudding 
 Cabinet pudding 
 Christmas pudding 
 Eve's pudding 
 Figgy pudding 
 Fruit hat 
 Jam Roly-Poly 
 Malvern pudding 
 Queen of Puddings 
 Rice pudding 
 Spotted dick
 Sticky toffee pudding 
 Suet pudding 
 Summer pudding 
 Sussex pond pudding 
 Treacle sponge pudding 
 Waldorf pudding

Scottish desserts

 Abernethy biscuit
 Black bun
 Clootie
 Cranachan
 Deep-fried Mars bar
 Dundee cake
 Empire biscuit
 Fudge doughnut
 Penguin
 Tipsy laird
 Scottish cake

Commercial products
 Vienetta

See also

 British cuisine
 English cuisine
 Scottish cuisine
 Welsh cuisine
 List of desserts

References

External links
 
 
 

 
British
Desserts